Diego Carrillo Pendas (born 25 September 1982 in Barcelona, Catalonia) is a Spanish footballer who plays as a midfielder.

External links
 
 
 
 

1982 births
Living people
Footballers from Barcelona
Spanish footballers
Association football midfielders
Segunda División players
Segunda División B players
Tercera División players
CE Sabadell FC footballers
CE L'Hospitalet players
UE Lleida players
UE Figueres footballers
CD Toledo players
CD Puertollano footballers
CD Castellón footballers
Maltese Premier League players
Rabat Ajax F.C. players
Spanish expatriate footballers
Expatriate footballers in Malta